Suwon Baek clan is one of the Korean clans. Their Bon-gwan is in Suwon, Gyeonggi Province. According to the research held in 2015, the number of Suwon Baek clan’s member was 354,428. Their founder was  who came to Silla and took a government post. His hometown was Hua Prefecture (Shaanxi).

See also 
 Korean clan names of foreign origin

References

External links 
 

 
Korean clan names of Chinese origin
Baek clans